Southington is a town in Hartford County, Connecticut, United States. As of the 2020 United States Census, it had a population of 43,501. Southington contains the villages of Marion,   Milldale, and Plantsville.

Geography

It includes the areas of Plantsville, Marion and Milldale, each of which has its own post office and distinct architecture. The town rests in a valley of two mountains on its east and west sides. The town is located along exits 28 through 32 of Interstate 84, exit 4 of Interstate 691, and bisected by Connecticut Route 10. Southington has the nickname of "The Apple Valley", due to the many orchards that still dot its landscape. The Quinnipiac River flows through the town. It is home to Mount Southington ski area, which has drawn visitors since the 1960s.

Southington is located at geographical coordinates 41° 35′ 48" North, 72° 52′ 40" West (41.596588, −72.87767).

The Metacomet Ridge, a rugged trap rock mountain ridge that extends from Long Island Sound to the Massachusetts/Vermont border, passes through Southington. Notable peaks along the ridge form the eastern edge of town: Bradley Mountain, Ragged Mountain, Short Mountain, and part of the Hanging Hills. The ridge is traversed by the  Metacomet Trail.

Southington's west ridge is rich with many geological formations. This includes North Hamlin Brook, Roaring Brook, and Soltys Pond.  Soltys Pond was named after Alexander Soltys, who settled in the area in 1713.  The most well-known geological formation in the area is one of several in the world known as the Great Unconformity.

Located less than one mile northwest of the Great Unconformity on Southington Mountain is Hushak Rock, known informally for decades as White Rock. The overlook has expansive views of the region and can be seen from much of Route 229 and area neighborhoods. The state of Connecticut officially named Hushak Rock in 2017 for longtime Southington civic leader and World War II pilot Walter J. Hushak (b. 1923).

History

Although Southington was formally established as a town in 1779, its roots go back to a much earlier time. Samuel Woodruff, Southington's first white settler, moved from Farmington to the area then known as "Panthorne" that was settled in 1698 and the land was formerly occupied by the  Tunxis or Sepores Indians. The settlement grew, prospered, and came to be known as "South Farmington" and then later, the shortened version, Southington.

The town's most important early visitor was General George Washington, who passed through the town in 1770 on his way to Wethersfield.

The Marion section of Southington is one of the most historic places in the town. It is the site of an encampment by the great French general, Jean-Baptiste Donatien de Vimeur, comte de Rochambeau, and his troops during the American Revolutionary War. In June 1781, the French troops under Rochambeau's command left Farmington and marched  to their eighth camp through Connecticut, near Asa Barnes Tavern in the Marion section of Southington, now the Marion Historic District.

They camped there for four days. Rochambeau and his officers took shelter in the tavern, and the troops set up camp on a hill on the other side of the road. The area of the encampment has since become known as French Hill, and a marker on the east side of Marion Avenue commemorates the French campsite.  According to Rev. Timlow's Sketches of Southington (1875), "Landlord Barnes gave a ball at his tavern, at which a large number of the young women of the vicinity were present; and they esteemed it something of an honor to have had a 'cotillion' with the polite foreigner." The celebrations-infused with spirits provided by Landlord Barnes-spanned the four nights they were in Southington. Rochambeau revisited Barnes's Tavern on the return march on October 27, 1782. According to Timlow, coins, buttons and other things were picked up in the vicinity many years after the two encampments. The Asa Barnes Tavern is now a private residence very near the camp site at 1089 Marion Avenue.

Southington originally was a small, rural farming community. In the early 1900s, Southington developed as a manufacturing center, but still maintained a very small population of a few thousand residents. Some of the products invented there include the first cement that was able to harden under water, the first carriage bolt cutting machine, the break-neck rat trap, and a new tinware process.

With the overall decline of industry in New England, and the construction of Interstate 84 in the mid 1960s, Southington developed into a bedroom community in which the town saw explosive growth and a population that has surged to over 42,000 today. 28% of the workers in Southington are still employed in manufacturing, most of them in the production of fabricated metals and aircraft.

In May 1942, during World War II, the town was selected by the War Department to be highlighted in a defense booklet called Southington, CT—Microcosm of America. Photographers roamed the community taking photos of residents at work, at play and in their homes and churches. The final publication was intended to show friends and foes alike in Europe the typical American citizens and families, their traditions and values. Thousands of copies were dropped from military airplanes over Europe during the Nazi German Occupation. Also in 1942 the mural, Romance of Southington, was painted in the town post office by Ann Hunt Spence. Murals were produced from 1934 to 1943 in the United States through the Section of Painting and Sculpture, later called the Section of Fine Arts, of the Treasury Department. The WPA was the largest and most ambitious American New Deal agency, employing individuals to carry out public works projects.

Each year, Southington is home to the Apple Harvest Festival, an effort to bring together local businesses and denizens from the area and surrounding cities. This has been a tradition of the town since 1969, generally spanning six weekdays and two weekends. Its highlights include a town parade, carnival rides and games, musical performances, and a wide selection of unique recipes and foods served by community cornerstones including the Boy Scouts of America, local churches, the Southington Fire Department and Police Department, the Southington Rotary Chapter, and the  Southington Jaycees. Southington is home to several farms and apple orchards, including Rogers Orchards, the largest in the state.

On May 24, 1962, the town was heavily damaged by a high-end F3 tornado. The tornado, which was "near-F4" intensity at the time, damaged or destroyed numerous buildings, homes, businesses, and vehicles throughout the area before it dissipated northeast of town. Overall, the storm left one dead and 50 injured.

Two of Southington's main state roads are ceremonially named for notable residents. Southington's portion of Route 10 is named the Louis G. Tolles Memorial Highway for the late state Grange leader and legislator (1885–1956). The road was dedicated on Aug. 6, 1960, and rededicated with new signs on Oct. 6, 2007. A section of Route 364 (Oakland Road and Berlin Street) was dedicated as the Officer Timothy Foley Memorial Highway on Sept. 11, 2009, in honor of the first (and to date the only) Southington police officer killed in the line of duty. He died six days after being struck by a vehicle on Dec. 30, 1937.

In January 2011, John Weichsel retired as town manager after 44 years. He was hired by the first Town Council when the council/manager form of government was established in town in 1966. His tenure as a town manager in the same community is one of the longest in the United States.  Weichsel died in 2013. The municipal center at 196–200 North Main St. is named in his honor.

Politics 

At the state level: Southington is divided into the following districts for the Connecticut House of Representatives: 30, 80, 81 and 103; It is part of district 16 for the Connecticut Senate; It is part of Connecticut's 1st Congressional District at the federal level.

At the local level: The Town of Southington has a form of government, known as "Council Manager Government." It consists of a nine-member Town Council, elected by popular vote. The nine-member council appoints a full-time administrator, known as the Town Manager.

Voters elect a Planning and Zoning Commission (four year terms), Board of Education (two year terms), Board of Finance (two year terms), Water Commission (two year terms), Town Clerk (six year terms) and a Registratr of Voters (four term terms).

Demographics

As of the 2010 census, there were 43,069 people, 16,814 households, and 12,036 families residing in the town. The racial makeup of the town was 95.4% White, 1.9% African American, 0.4% Native American, 2.5% Asian, 0.1% Pacific Islander, 0.9% from other races, and 1.2% from two or more races. Hispanic or Latino of any race were 3.4% of the population.

There were 16,814 households, out of which 31.8% had children under the age of 18 living with them, 58.2% were married couples living together, 9.4% had a female householder with no husband present, and 28.8% were non-families. 24% of all households were made up of individuals, and 11.8% had someone living alone who was 65 years of age or older. The average household size was 2.54 and the average family size was 3.01.

In the town, the population was spread out, with 23.8% under the age of 18, 5.9% from 18 to 24, 29.3% from 25 to 44, 26.3% from 45 to 64, and 14.7% who were 65 years of age or older. The median age was 43.3 years. For every 100 females, there were 94.1 males. For every 100 females age 18 and over, there were 90.1 males.

As of 2015, the median income for a household in the town was $82,704, and the median income for a family was $102,775. Households in Southington were relatively affluent, with 41.9% of its households earning above $100,000. The per capita income for the town was $36,682 according to the 2010 census. Males had a median income of $68,378 versus $50,599 for females. About 2.2% of families and 3.5% of the population were below the poverty line, including 3.0% of those under age 18 and 5.6% of those age 65 or over.

Economy

Top employers
Top employers in Southington according to the town's 2019 Comprehensive Annual Financial Report

Revitalization

As industry in the area declined, many old factories and buildings were left vacant. The latest to close was Ideal Forging, which filed for bankruptcy in 2001 and vacated its building in the town center. In 2005, Meridian Development Partners of New York City purchased the land with plans to transform the former factory site into homes and retail space. Demolition of the factory began in October 2014.

Southington has taken the initiative to spur its own revitalization. In 2002, the town completed the downtown renaissance project. This project replaced the sidewalks on Main Street and Center Street with granite curbing and brick paving stones. Lifelong resident and philanthropist Robert Petroske donated $50,000 to the revitalization effort which led to the installation of decorative iron lamp posts, benches, and garbage cans. Flowering trees were planted, and a former fountain and light fixture was restored and relocated from Recreation Park (where it had been moved in 1961) to the town center. A renaissance zone was created where private business owners in the zone could apply to the town to continue the project of granite, brick pavers, and lamp posts, of which the town would pay the difference of replacement concrete sidewalks versus the more expensive brick. The extension of brick pavers from Center Street to a section on the east side of Liberty Street was completed in July 2008 to connect with the pavers installed outside the new Liberty Square office building.

The town water department, which built a new facility on West Queen Street in 2002, demolished its former facility located between Mill and High streets in June 2008 and developed the land into a landscaped park, along with a continuation of the sidewalks, iron fences and decorative lamp posts. The old water facility abuts the linear walking trail.

The linear trail opened to the public in the summer of 2003. This trail was built over the town's old rail line which had ceased operation several years earlier. Dubbed the Farmington Canal Greenway, when completed it will stretch from New Haven, Connecticut, to Northampton, Massachusetts, following the route of the historical Farmington Canal. The second phase of construction on the trail, which officially opened in 2011, redeveloped the old train line from Plantsville center to the Cheshire town line. The project has brought landscaping, iron benches, and intersections of brick pavers where the trail crosses roads. This is seen as a major link for the further revitalization of downtown Southington and Plantsville. Eventually the trail will connect with the Cheshire-to-New Haven route.

Lake Compounce 
Lake Compounce is partly in Southington, and Bristol. Founded in 1846, it is the oldest amusement park in the US.

Schools

Southington has eight public elementary schools, two middle schools and one high school. It also has an alternative school for children in grades 8–12 called ALTA. Approximately 6,500 students are enrolled in Southington public schools, making it one of the larger districts in the state of Connecticut. Southington High School has a growing enrollment exceeding 2,200 students, of which 90% of graduates attend post-secondary education.

Due to Southington's popularity as a family suburb, the town has undertaken plans to expand all schools to accommodate the growing enrollment. Three elementary schools have been completed, and a new building and second cafeteria has been added to the high school campus. Voters recently approved expansion and renovations to two other elementary schools (with one to be demolished and rebuilt), as well as to the two middle schools.

Southington also has two parochial schools; Southington Catholic is pre-kindergarten through eighth and the other, Central Christian Academy is pre-kindergarten through twelfth.

Elementary schools

 Walter A. Derynoski (240 Main St.)
 Flanders (100 Victoria Dr)
 William H. Hatton
 Urbin T. Kelley
 Zaya A. Oshana (renamed June 2019; formerly Plantsville School)
 South End
 William M. Strong
 Reuben E. Thalberg

Middle schools

 Joseph A. DePaolo
 John F. Kennedy

High schools

 Southington High School
 Karen Smith Academy (formerly Southington Alternative Education or ALTA)

Parochial schools

 Southington Catholic (Pre-K–8)  – formerly St. Thomas School (Pre-K–8) & Saint Dominic School (Pre-K–5)
 Central Christian Academy (Pre-K–12)

Colleges

 New England Baptist College

Transportation

Buses
On March 28, 2015, CTfastrak, Connecticut's first bus rapid transit corridor, opened. It provides a separated right-of-way between Hartford and New Britain; Express bus services travel between downtown Hartford and Waterbury, with service to Southington, with its free park-and-ride located at the corner of South Main and Mulberry streets. Following its creation, public transportation can now connect Southington residents to Waterbury station and the Metro-North Railroad, providing service to Bridgeport and ultimately Stamford and New York City.

Highways
Southington is home to several highways, including Interstate 84, also known as The Yankee Expressway, and Interstate 691.

Parks and recreation
Southington boasts a fair share of large parks and open land, each serving several outdoor activities, and as a whole, a vast array of them.

Public
 Crescent Lake
 Panthorn Park
 Recreation Park
 Southington Dog Park
 Soltys Pond
 Southington Little League Fields
 Veterans Memorial Park

Recreation
 Mount Southington Ski Resort
 Southington Country Club
 Hawks Landing Country Club
 North Ridge Golf Club (Formerly Pine Valley Golf Course)
 Metacomet Trail
 Ragged Mountain
 Southington Community YMCA
 Lake Compounce

Notable people

 John Anderson (born 1965), SportsCenter anchor
 Jim Aparo (1932–2005), comic book artist for DC Comics
 Tom Cichowski (1944–2015), football player
 Vince Clements (born 1949), professional football player 1972–1973, NY Giants
 Jonathan Coachman (born 1972), "Sportscenter" anchor and former WWE authority figure
 Ann Dandrow (1936–2017), educator and politician
 Chris Denorfia (born 1980), baseball player
 Rob Dibble (born 1964), baseball player, talk show host
 Marcus H. Holcomb (1844–1932), Governor of Connecticut
 Lisa Robin Kelly (1970–2013), actress
 Ellen Olney Kirk (1842–1928), novelist
 Aaron Lipstadt born 1952, film director and producer
 Mansfield Merriman (1848–1925), civil engineer, educator, and writer
 Alwin Nikolais (1910–1993), choreographer
 Jesse Olney (1798–1872), geographer
 Carl Pavano (born 1976), baseball player
 Tom Poitras (born 1968), head soccer coach at the University of Hartford
 Delando Pratt (1823–1874), member of the Wisconsin State Assembly
 Sal Romano (born 1993), baseball player
 Joel Root (1770–1847), author of a journal of a voyage around the world (1802–1806) while working as supercargo on the sealing ship Huron
 John H. Swift (1840–1911), member of the New York State Assembly
 Joseph Twichell (1838–1918), writer and minister
 Logan West (born 1994), Miss Teen USA 2012
 Charles Whittlesey (geologist) (1808–1886), geologist
 Dale Zarrella, sculptor

National Register of Historic Places 

There are numerous houses and districts in Southington that are listed on the National Register of Historic Places, including:

 Luman Andrews House—469 Andrews St.
 Atwater Manufacturing Company—335 Atwater St.
 Asa Barnes Tavern—1089 Marion Ave.
 Selah Barnes House—282 Prospect St.
 Barnes-Frost House—1177 Marion Ave.
 Blakeslee Forging Company—100 W. Main St.
 Icabod Bradley House—537 Shuttle Meadow Rd.
 Clark Brothers Factory No. 1—1331 S. Main St.
 Clark Brothers Factory No. 2—409 Canal St.
 Avery Clark House—1460 Meriden Ave.
 Capt. Josiah Cowles House—184 Marion Ave.
 Ebenezer Evans House—17 Long Bottom Rd.
 Farmington Canal-New Haven and Northampton Canal
 Stephen Grannis House—1193 West St.
 Timothy Hart House—521 Flanders Rd.
 House at 1010 Shuttle Meadow Road—1010 Shuttle Meadow Rd.
 House at 590 West Street—590 West St.
 Hurwood Company—379 Summer St.
 Lake Compounce Carousel—West of Southington Center on Lake Ave.
 Marion Historic District—Along Marion Ave. and Meriden-Waterbury Turnpike
 Meriden Avenue-Oakland Road Historic District—Roughly Oakland Rd. between Meriden and Berlin Aves., and Meriden Ave. between Oakland Rd. and Delhunty Dr.
 Roswell Moore II House—1166 Andrews St.
 Peck, Stow & Wilcox Factory—217 Center St.
 Plantsville Historic District—Roughly bounded by Prospect St., Summer St., the Quinnipiac River, Grove St., S. Main St., W. Main St., and West St.
 Dr. J. Porter House—391 Belleview Ave.
 Pultz & Walkley Company—120 W. Main St.
 Jonathan Root House—140-142 N. Main St.
 Dr. Henry Skelton House—889 S. Main St.
 H. D. Smith Company Building—24 West St.
 Southington Center Historic District
 Southington Public Library—239 Main St.
 Horace Webster Farmhouse—577 South End Rd.
 West Street School—1432 West St.
 Rev. John Wightman House—1024 Mount Vernon Rd.
 Valentine Wightman House—1112 Mount Vernon Rd.
 Woodruff House—377 Berlin St.
 Capt. Samuel Woodruff House—23 Old State Rd.
 Ezekiel Woodruff House—1152 East St.
 Jotham Woodruff House—137-139 Woodruff St.
 Urbana Woodruff House—1096 East St.

Pictures

See also

References

External links

 Town of Southington official website

 
Towns in Hartford County, Connecticut
Towns in Connecticut
Greater Hartford